Tremestieri Etneo is a comune (municipality) in the Metropolitan City of Catania in the Italian region Sicily, located about  southeast of Palermo and about  north of Catania.

Tremestieri Etneo borders the following municipalities: Catania, Gravina di Catania, Mascalucia, Pedara, San Giovanni la Punta, San Gregorio di Catania, Sant'Agata li Battiati.

References

External links
 Official website

Cities and towns in Sicily